Pyidawtha is a village located in the Kalay Township, Sagaing Division, northern Myanmar (Latitude: 21° 55' 0 N, Longitude: 95° 46' 0 E). The total estimated population is 5,000 people according to Dr. Mung. It is one of the major places where the Tedim Zomi people live, and Tedim language is spoken in the village.

Academic achievement in Pyidawtha village is still very poor due to various constraints. So far, one villager is qualified to attend Medical College at Magwe. Besides, there are a few number of villagers who hold Doctorate degree in Theology.

The township is home to the Kalay University.

References

External links
Pictures of Pyidwatha

Populated places in Kale District